William Whitelaw (15 March 1868 – 19 January 1946) was a Conservative politician in Scotland and a long serving railway director and chairman. He was the third son of Alexander Whitelaw and a younger brother of Graeme Whitelaw.

He was elected at the 1892 general election as the Member of Parliament (MP) for Perth, but lost his seat at the 1895 general election and was defeated when he stood again in 1900.

Of a Scottish landed gentry family, Whitelaws of Gartshore in Dumbartonshire, and an Old Harrovian and graduate of Trinity College, Cambridge, Whitelaw was a director of the Highland Railway (HR) from 1898, and Chairman of the HR from 1902 to 1912, and again in 1916. He was later Chairman of the North British Railway (NBR), being appointed in 1912, and when the NBR amalgamated with other railways at the start of 1923 to form the London and North Eastern Railway (LNER), Whitelaw was elected unanimously to become the first Chairman of the LNER. He resigned from this post in September 1938.

Whitelaw was married to Gertrude, daughter of Colonel T. C. Thompson of Milton Hall, Cumberland; they were the paternal grandparents of politician William Whitelaw, 1st Viscount Whitelaw by their son, William Alexander Whitelaw, who was killed in the First World War.

References

External links 
 

1868 births
1946 deaths
Alumni of Trinity College, Cambridge
London and North Eastern Railway people
Members of the Parliament of the United Kingdom for Scottish constituencies
North British Railway people
Scottish Tory MPs (pre-1912)
UK MPs 1892–1895